The 1992 United States presidential election in Missouri was held on November 3, 1992, as part of the broader 1992 United States presidential election in all fifty states and the District of Columbia. Voters chose 11 electors, or representatives to the Electoral College, who voted for President and Vice-President.

From 1904 to 2004, Missouri voted for the eventual winner of every presidential election except 1956. The state was won in 1992 by Governor of Arkansas Bill Clinton (D) with 44.07 percent of the popular vote, over incumbent President George Herbert Walker Bush (R) with 33.92 percent of the popular vote — the smallest vote share for a Republican since 1860 when the party was not seriously contesting slave states outside of the Missouri Rhineland. Independent Ross Perot performed extremely well for a third-party candidate with 21.69 percent of the popular vote — the best third-party performance in Missouri since Constitutional Unionist John Bell in that same 1860 election.

Bush’s failure can be seen in Clinton being the solitary Democrat to win staunchly Unionist German “Forty-Eighter” Warren County since Stephen A. Douglas in 1860, and the first Democrat to carry similarly Unionist Ozark Hickory County since that same election, the only Democrat to carry Morgan County since Franklin D. Roosevelt in 1932, and the first to carry Benton County also since 1932.

, this remains the last time that Dallas County, Howell County, Harrison County, Adair County, Andrew County, Johnson County, Butler County, Atchison County, Phelps County, Platte County, Maries County, Stoddard County, Pulaski County, Dent County, Texas County, and Carter County have voted for a Democratic presidential candidate. It was also the last time that a Democrat carried the state by double digits, the last double-digit win for any candidate until 2016, the last time that Missouri has voted to the left of neighboring Iowa, and the last time that the state voted more Democratic than the nation as a whole, weighing in at about 4 points more Democratic.

Results

Results by county

See also
 United States presidential elections in Missouri
 Presidency of Bill Clinton

Notes

References

Missouri
1992
1992 Missouri elections